Lookout Nunatak is a nunatak lying  southeast of Monte Cassino in the Freyberg Mountains of Victoria Land, Antarctica. The nunatak is in the middle of an icefall overlooking Gallipoli Heights to the southwest. It was so named by New Zealand Antarctic Research Programme geologist P.J. Oliver because the nunatak served as a lookout on the initial visit to the area in the 1981–82 season.

References

Nunataks of Victoria Land
Pennell Coast